Nikola Rachelle Bedingfield (born 8 November 1986), known professionally as Nikola Rachelle and as The Golden Phoenix, is an English singer and songwriter. She is the younger sister of Daniel and Natasha Bedingfield. Bedingfield has created music for advertisements and television shows such as General Hospital and Tough Love.

Biography 
When Bedingfield was a teenager, she and her siblings formed the dance/electronic group The DNA Algorithm.

In August 2006, she announced her debut release, an EP available exclusively on iTunes from 30 October 2006, called Don't Talk About This Love, which included the eponymous track. The title track was later covered by Cheryl for her debut solo album 3 Words.

Bedingfield co-wrote "Limbo", which was included on JoJo's album Jumping Trains. She provided the backing vocals for David Archuleta's album The Other Side of Down.

Bedingfield has worked with a large range of writers, including Eve Nelson and Peter Kvint.

Discography

Albums
Unleashed (TBA)

EPs
Don't Talk About This Love (2006)

Recorded songs
 "Battleships"
 "The Coca-Cola Song" (a.k.a. "Follow the Bubble")
 "Don't Talk About This Love"
 "Forest Fire"
 "Foxy"
 "Hero's and Fools"
 "In Your Arms"
 "Loved by You"
 "The Man from Venezuela"
 "Night Before"
 "Phoenix"
 "Promised Land"
 "Sirens"
 "Soldier On"
 "Strings of Gold"
 "Take Me Home"
 "Turn Me On, Turn Me Up"
 "Your Eyes"

Written songs
 "Breath"
 "Blue Soles (Lock Me Away)"
 "Come Find Me"
 "The Great Divorce"
 "Hey Hey Hey"
 "Horizon"
 "How Now Brown Cow"
 "Lost Love"
 "Madly and Randomly"
 "Nobody Got a Boy Like Mine"
 "Scarlet Envy" (a.k.a. "The Son of a Bitch You Are")
 "Stay With Me" (a.k.a. "My Love")
 "Sticks and Stones" (a.k.a. "Freedom from You")
 "Sudden Silence"
 "Sweet Karma"
 "Walking Through Walls"
 "Watchyou Want"

Other songs
 "The Best Sex" – Printz Board feat. Nikola Bedingfield
 "Faith Over Fear" – Dave Kull feat. Nikola Rachelle
 "Vagabonds" – Grizfolk
 "Reaching" – Zhu feat. Nikola Bedingfield

Songwriting credits
 "Battleships" - Peter Kvint
 "Best Time Ever" – Printz Board
 "Bullet" – Erika Heynatz
 "Don't Talk About This Love" – Cheryl
 "Fighters" – Carly Rose Sonenclar
 "F'NA" – Printz Board
 "Girlfriend" – Hannah Defore
 "Give It Back" - Hennessy
 "I Just Wanna Love You" – Printz Board
 "If I Get an Encore" – Christy Moore
 "Illusion" – Josh Strickland
 "Last Dance" - Jake Austin Walker
 "Love, Love, Love" – Printz Board
 "Limbo" – JoJo
 "On My Way to You" - Hennessy
 "Purple Hearts (Soldier of Love)" – CeeLo Green
 "Reaching" – Zhu
 "Superbad" – Jesse McCartney
 "Supernova" – Bartholomew
 "Take Your Mind Off It" – Brock Baker
 "Tempted By Your Touch" – Joana Zimmer
 "What It Do" – Printz Board
 "World Gone Crazy" – Shane Stevens
 "You're Beautiful" – Paul Wright
 "Young n Stupid" – Brock Baker

References

External links
 Official website

1986 births
Living people
English people of New Zealand descent
English women pop singers
English women singer-songwriters
Singers from London
English soul singers
21st-century English women singers
21st-century English singers